Tanja is a feminine given name. It may refer to:

Mononyms
Tanja (born 1983), Russian-Estonian singer, also known as Tanja Mihhailova

Given name
Tanja Andrejeva (born 1978), Macedonian handball player
Tanja Bogosavljević (born 1989), Serbian handball player
Tanja Bošković (born 1953), Serbian actress
Tanja Carovska, Macedonian singer, songwriter, and composer
Tanja Chub (born 1970), Ukrainian-Dutch draughts player
Tanja Damaske (born 1971), German javelin thrower
Tanja Dickenscheid (born 1969), German field hockey player
Tanja Dragić (born 1991), Serbian Paralympian athlete
Tanja Eisenschmid (born 1993), German ice hockey player
Tanja Eisner (born 1980), Ukrainian and German mathematician
Tanja Fajon (born 1971), Slovenian politician and a journalist
Tanja Frieden (born 1976), Swiss snowboarder
Tanja Godina (born 1970), Slovenian backstroke swimmer
Tanja Hart (born 1974), German volleyball player
Tanja Hess, German bobsledder
Tanja Jacobs, Canadian actor and director
Tanja Jadnanansing (born 1967), Dutch politician, television presenter and communication employee
Tanja Kari, Finnish Paralympic cross-country skier
Tanja Karišik-Košarac (born 1991), Bosnian cross country skier
Tanja Karpela (born 1970), Finnish politician and former Miss Finland
Tanja Kiridžić (born 1986), Croatian handball player
Tanja Karišik (born 1991), cross country skier and athlete from Bosnia and Herzegovina
Tanja Klein (born 1969), German track and road cyclist
Tanja Kolbe (born 1990), German ice dancer
Tanja Kostić (born 1972), Serbian-Swedish women's basketball player
Tanja Kreil (born 1977), German electrician
Tanja Krienke (born 1972), former competitive figure skater for East Germany
Tanja Liedtke (1977–2007), German-born professional choreographer and dancer
Tanja Lorentzon (born 1971), Sweden-Finnish actress
Tanja Mayer (born 1993), Swiss athlete and bobsledder
Tanja Mihhailova (born 1983), Russian-Estonian singer, known as Tanja
Tanja Milanović (born 1977), Serbian handballer
Tanja Miletić Oručević (born 1970), Bosnian theatre director, academic lecturer, and translator
Tanja Morel (born 1975), Swiss skeleton race
Tanja Nijmeijer (born 1978), Dutch guerilla fighter
Tanja Ostojić (born 1972), performance artist from Yugoslavia
Tanya Plibersek (born 1969), Australian politician
Tanja Ribič (born 1968), Slovenian actress and a singer
Tanja Savić (born 1985), Serbian pop-folk singer
Tanja Schärer (born 1989), Swiss freestyle skier
Tanja Schmidt-Hennes (born 1971), German professional cyclist
Tanja Schneider (born 1974), Austrian former alpine skier
Tanja Schuck, German sprint canoer
Tanja Slater (born 1978), road cyclist from United Kingdom
Tanja Šmid, Slovenian swimmer
Tanja Tuomi (born 1996), Finnish tennis player
Tanja Szewczenko (born 1977), German figure skater and actress
Tanja Vrabel (born 1990), Slovenian football player
Tanja Vučković (born 1981), Serbian handball player
Tanja Wedhorn (born 1971), German actress
Tanja Wenzel (born 1978), German film and TV actress
Tanja Žakelj (born 1988), Slovenian racing cyclist

Fictional characters
Tanja von Lahnstein, a fictional character from a German soap opera

Ships
Tanja (ship, 1959), a ferry used on the Elbe in Germany

See also 
Alternate name of Tanya, a given name
 Tanya (name)
 Tania (name)
 Tonya (name)
 Tonje (name)
 Tonja (name)
 Tonia (name)

German feminine given names
Macedonian feminine given names
Serbian feminine given names
Slovene feminine given names
Finnish feminine given names